Stephen Mark Punt (born 15 September 1962) is a British comedy writer, comedian and actor. Along with Hugh Dennis, he is part of the double act Punt and Dennis and presenter of BBC Radio 4 satirical news programme The Now Show. He is also a writer and programme associate for various television panel game shows, including Would I Lie to You? and Mock the Week, and is a writer for fellow comedians such as Rory Bremner and Jasper Carrott.

Early life
Punt was educated at Whitgift School and St Catharine's College, Cambridge, where he read English. While at Cambridge, he joined Footlights, where he first met comedy partner Hugh Dennis and was vice-president from 1983 to 1985 with Nick Hancock as president. He was in the writing team for three revues in a row.

Career
While at university Punt began writing for the BBC Radio 4 series Week Ending. Punt and Dennis later became resident guest comedians on shows presented by Jasper Carrott, including Carrott Confidential and Canned Carrott with Punt contributing in the writing team as well. They also toured with Carrott as a live support act.

They were then recruited in 1988, along with fellow former Footlights member David Baddiel and his comedy partner Rob Newman, to write and perform a satirical sketch and stand-up show called The Mary Whitehouse Experience on BBC Radio 1. After three years, the show had proved such a big hit that it transferred to television. Punt and Dennis went on to perform in their own TV sketch show, The Imaginatively Titled Punt & Dennis Show, and co-wrote and starred with Nick Hancock in the sitcom Me, You and Him.

Punt has worked more as a writer, script editor and voice-over artist in recent years, though he has also performed with Dennis in It's Been a Bad Week for BBC Radio 2. The pair are also the main presenters and writers of BBC Radio 4's The Now Show and the writers of Radio 4 sitcom The Party Line. Punt, with Mark Tavener, is co-writer of the 2007 Radio 4 series His Master's Voice. He also, with the help of Hugh Dennis, Jon Holmes, Marcus Brigstocke and Mitch Benn wrote The Now Show Book of World Records, a follow-up book for The Now Show.

Punt is a "programme associate" for the satirical programme Mock The Week, in which Dennis is a regular team member. He has also written and provided additional material for Would I Lie to You?.

In 2008 Punt wrote the script for and performed in Rockford's Rock Opera, a critically acclaimed ecological musical story created with school friend, Matthew Sweetapple, which has been published as an audiobook.

2008 also saw the first episode of Punt PI, a fact-based comedy radio series on BBC Radio 4 in which Punt investigates mysteries in Britain. The show continued occasionally until 2017, racking up 10 series.

In 2011, Punt became the presenter of Radio 4 quiz show The 3rd Degree. Punt played Eric Idle in the BBC adaptation Holy Flying Circus, covering the controversy surrounding the release of Monty Python's Life of Brian.

Unlike his comedy partner Dennis, Punt has mostly done screenwriting and script editing for various BBC shows, television programmes and documentaries. His credits include The Rory Bremner Show, The Nearly Complete and Utter History of Everything, various episodes of Spitting Image and its retrospective documentary Best Ever Spitting Image, Baddiel's Syndrome and Horrible Histories.

On 3 January 2013 Punt appeared on Celebrity Mastermind. His specialist subject was Tony Hancock and his chosen supported charity was The Stillbirth and Neonatal Death Society (Sands). Punt won the contest.

During 2016 Punt toured with the production of The Rocky Horror Show in the role of the narrator.

Since 2018, Punt has been one of the 'comedy experts' paying tribute to a number of comedians in the Sky Arts television series Comedy Legends with Barry Cryer, with Punt discussing the careers of comedians like Tina Fey and Tim Allen.

References

External links

1962 births
Alumni of St Catharine's College, Cambridge
British male comedians
Living people
People educated at Whitgift School
20th-century British comedians
21st-century British comedians